Thomson Cove is a cove 1 nautical mile (1.9 km) wide, lying just north of Etienne Fjord in Flandres Bay, along the west coast of Graham Land. First charted and named "Baie Thomson" by the French Antarctic Expedition under Charcot, 1903–05, for Gaston-Arnold-Marie Thomson (1848–1932), French politician who was Minister of the Navy in 1905.

Coves of Graham Land
Danco Coast